The following is a timeline of the growth of Mumbai's population over the last four centuries:

 1661: 10000 inhabitants
 1664: 15000
 1673: 60000 (Fryer)
 1675: 60000
 1718: 16000 (Cobbe)
 1744: 70000 (Niebuhr) (large influx of people during the busy season)
 1764: 140000 (Niebuhr), According to Historical account pg 6, pop was 60,000
 1780: 100,000 Materials etc. Part III, pg 525 -- Mahim 13,726
 1812: 235,000 (Hall) Fixed 165,000, migratory 50,000, famine increase 20,000
 1814: 180,000 (Warden)
 1830: 229,000 Lagrange
 1836: 236,000 "-do-
 1864: 816,562
 1872: 644,605 (census)
 1881: 773,196 (census)
 1891: 821,764 (census)
 1901: 812,912 (Greater Bombay)
 1911: 1,018,388
 1921: 1,244,934
 1931: 1,268,936
 1941: 1,686,127
 1951: 2,966,902 (0.1% of the world population)
 1961: 4,152,056
 1971: 5,970,575
 1981: 8,227,382
 1991: 9,900,000 + 2,600,000 (Thané) = 12,500,000 (Greater Bombay)
 2001: 16,368,084 (Greater Mumbai, incl. Thané)
 2005: 18,366,089 Greater Mumbai, incl. Thane)
 2011: 18,410,000
 2020: 20,411,274

See also
 Housing in Mumbai

References

History of Mumbai
Mumbai